Anastasia Robinson ( – April 1755), later known as Anastasia, Countess of Peterborough, was an English soprano, later contralto, of the Baroque era. She is best remembered for her association with the composer George Frideric Handel, in whose operas she sang.

Early life and initial career
Robinson was the eldest daughter of Thomas Robinson, a portrait painter who worked for a time in Italy (where she is thought to have been born). Initially her musical talent was privately trained, and her first performances were at private society concerts at Golden Square, where her father owned a property. At these concerts she both sang and accompanied herself on the harpsichord. In the early 1710s her father's eyesight began to fail and Robinson, forced to earn a living for herself and her family, turned professional.

Professional career
Her association with Handel can be dated to 1714, when he wrote the solo soprano role in the Ode for the Birthday of Queen Anne for her. She joined his company early that year, making her debut in Creso, a pasticcio. As the year went on she sang in revivals of Arminio and Ernelinda (both pasticcios, possibly with music by Nicola Haym); on several occasions new music was written for her. London audiences clearly gave her a good reception, and her career continued to prosper; she played the role of Almirena in a 1715 revival of Rinaldo, and originated the role of Oriana in Handel's Amadigi. In a 1717 revival of this opera Handel created a new scene for her and Nicolini, the brilliant castrato who had earlier originated the title role in Rinaldo. The retired soprano Joanna Maria Lindehleim was one of her teachers at some point. Around 1719 it seems that an illness caused her voice to drop from that of a soprano to that of a contralto. Upon the formation of Handel's Royal Academy of Music in 1719, Robinson was engaged on a yearly salary of £1000 and originated many new roles, most notably Zenobia (Radamisto), Irene (Muzio Scevola), Elmira (Floridante), Matilda (Ottone), Teodata (Flavio) and, most famously of all, the pathos-filled role of Cornelia in Giulio Cesare. She also sang in works by Bononcini and Ariosti, as well as a number of pasticcios. Soon after the premiere of Giulio Cesare in February 1724 she retired from the stage. In 1722 (or possibly 1723) she had secretly married Charles Mordaunt, 3rd Earl of Peterborough, although he did not acknowledge her status as his wife until 1735, just before his death; until then they lived separately, and society regarded her as his mistress.
Robinson seems to have come out of retirement in some capacity by 1745 as evidenced by her originating the role of Dejanira in Handel's Hercules.

Retirement
After Robinson's retirement she lived in Parsons Green, supported by Peterborough and her earnings from the opera. She did not detach herself from the musical world; she retained a close friendship with Bononcini, who had taught her in the past, and her house became a sort of academy-in-miniature at which Bononcini, Pier Francesco Tosi, and other musicians of the day frequently performed. For Bononcini she obtained a pension of £500 per annum from the Duchess of Marlborough. A Roman Catholic, she was also a friend of the poet Alexander Pope. After Peterborough's death in 1735, she lived at his family residence near Southampton. Lady Peterborough died in Bath, and her remains were interred in Bath Abbey.

Reputation
As a singer Robinson was noted for sweetness of tone, expressiveness and charisma rather than any particular virtuosic gifts. Handel was careful to use the orchestra to support the music he wrote for her, but the dramatic demands of her roles in Giulio Cesare and Flavio suggest that she possessed a not inconsiderable talent as an actress. De Fabrice, a Hanoverian diplomat visiting London in the early 1720s, compared her favourably to the extraordinary Margherita Durastanti (Sesto to Robinson's Cornelia in Cesare). Part of her correspondence is preserved for posterity in the Campori collection at Modena, and these, in addition to her personal popularity in society, suggest an attractive character.

See also
List of entertainers who married titled Britishers

Notes

References

1690s births
1755 deaths
English contraltos
Peterborough
English harpsichordists
English operatic sopranos
English Roman Catholics
Operatic contraltos
People from Parsons Green
People from Fulham
18th-century keyboardists
18th-century British women opera singers